Darjazin-e Sofla Rural District is a rural district (dehestan) in Qorveh-e Darjazin County, Hamadan Province, Iran. At the 2006 census, its population was 13,617, in 3,321 families. The rural district has 16 villages.

References 

Rural Districts of Hamadan Province
Razan County